N21 or N-21 may refer to:

Buses and trams
 N21 (Long Island bus), New York
 London Buses route N21

Roads
 N21 road (Belgium), a National Road in Belgium
 Route nationale 21, in France
 N21 road (Ireland)
 N21 (Cape Town), in South Africa
 Nebraska Highway 21, in the United States

Other uses
 , a minelayer of the Royal Navy
 Network TwentyOne, an Amway support organization
 Nieuport 21, a French First World War fighter
 Nitrogen-21, an isotope of nitrogen
 Tumbuka language
 N21, a postcode district in the N postcode area